Father Lacombe High School is a Catholic senior high school in Calgary, Alberta, Canada, named after Father Albert Lacombe. It has classes for grades 10 to 12 and is located in the southeast quadrant community of Radisson Heights, Calgary.

Academics

Special programs
The school provides French, Spanish, as a second language instruction. Lacombe is one of a small number of Calgary high schools to offer an International Baccalaureate (IB) Diploma Programme in English, French, and Spanish, Dance and Visual Art. The school is also part of the Action for Bright Children Society.

Athletics
Father Lacombe participates in many sports sanctioned by the Calgary Senior High School Athletic Association and the Alberta Schools Athletic Association, including Football (MCLA), Basketball, Soccer, Cross Country Running, Badminton, Track & Field, Girls Rugby, Wrestling, Swimming and Volleyball. The teams support both male and female, as well as the senior and junior teams.

References

External links

Simon's Story

High schools in Calgary
International Baccalaureate schools in Alberta
Catholic secondary schools in Alberta
Educational institutions established in 1978
1978 establishments in Alberta